Rensselaer Courthouse Square Historic District is a national historic district located at Rensselaer, Jasper County, Indiana.  It encompasses 37 contributing buildings, 2 contributing structures, and 3 contributing objects in the central business district of Rensselaer.  The district developed between about 1868 and 1955, and includes notable examples of Italianate, Romanesque Revival, Gothic Revival, Classical Revival, Art Deco, and Modern style architecture. Located in the district is the separately listed Jasper County Courthouse.  Other notable buildings include the Mobil Service Station (1955), Murray Building (1906), A. Leopold Building (1881), First National Bank Building (1917), IOOF Lodge (1895), Eigelsbach Building (1899), Eger Grocery (c. 1930), and Worden Building (1928).

It was listed on the National Register of Historic Places in 2012.

References

Historic districts on the National Register of Historic Places in Indiana
Italianate architecture in Indiana
Romanesque Revival architecture in Indiana
Gothic Revival architecture in Indiana
Neoclassical architecture in Indiana
Art Deco architecture in Indiana
Historic districts in Jasper County, Indiana
National Register of Historic Places in Jasper County, Indiana
Courthouses on the National Register of Historic Places in Indiana